Donald Olsen (July 23, 1919 - March 21, 2015) was an important mid-20th-century Bay Area architect.

He was born in Minnesota. He studied under Walter Gropius at Harvard and established an architecture practice in Berkeley in 1953. In 1954, he designed Olsen House (known as Donald and Helen Olsen House) in the International Style in Berkeley, California. Olsen was a member of the UC Berkeley School of Architecture faculty, which became the Department of Architecture when the College of Environmental Design was founded in 1959. Along with Vernon DeMars and Joseph Esherick, he designed Wurster Hall, which opened in 1964.

References

Further reading
 Landmarks Commission Embraces Modernism

American architects
Harvard Graduate School of Design alumni
UC Berkeley College of Environmental Design faculty